Free Library and Reading Room–Williamstown Memorial Library is located in the Williamstown section of Monroe Township, in Gloucester County, New Jersey, United States. The library was built in 1878 and was added to the National Register of Historic Places on October 1, 1987.

See also
National Register of Historic Places listings in Gloucester County, New Jersey

References

Library buildings completed in 1878
Buildings and structures in Gloucester County, New Jersey
Libraries on the National Register of Historic Places in New Jersey
National Register of Historic Places in Gloucester County, New Jersey
New Jersey Register of Historic Places
Monroe Township, Gloucester County, New Jersey